Vinarc i Epërm (in Albanian) or Gornje Vinarce (in Serbian: Горње Винарце) is a village in the municipality of Mitrovica in the District of Mitrovica, Kosovo. According to the 2011 census, it has 362 inhabitants.

Demography 
In 2011 census, the village had in total 362 inhabitants, from whom 362 (100 %) were Albanians

Notes

References 

Villages in Mitrovica, Kosovo